Unclassified is the first studio album by Robert Randolph and the Family Band.

PopMatters magazine reviewed the album favourably, concluding that "the one quality that holds it all together is joyousness". It described the opening track, 'Going in the Right Direction', as "a gospel-tinged, two steppin’, inspirational, tune that simply burns". The single taken from the album, 'Soul Refreshing', was described as "a light-hearted, groovy, feel good-tune in the vein of Al Green or perhaps even James Taylor".

Track listing
All songs written by Robert Randolph, except for where noted.
 "Going in the Right Direction" – 	3:32
 "I Need More Love" – 	3:42
 "Nobody" – 	4:32
 "Soul Refreshing" – 	3:41
 "Squeeze" (Randolph, Danyel Morgan) – 	5:46
 "Smile" – 	4:53
 "Good Times (3 Stroke)" – 	3:47
 "Why Should I Feel Lonely" (Randolph, Morgan) – 	4:25
 "Calypso" (Randolph, John Ginty) – 	4:07
 "Problems" (Randolph, Marcus Randolph, Ginty) – 	4:24
 "Run for Your Life" – 	4:53

Personnel
Robert Randolph  – Pedal Steel Guitar, Guitar (Acoustic), Guitar (Electric), Vocals
Neal Casal  – Vocals (background)
Rick Fowler  – Duet vocal on "Smile"
John Ginty  – B-3 Organ, Piano
Leon Mobley  - Percussion
Danyel Morgan  – Guitar (Acoustic), Bass, Guitar (Electric), Vocals
Lenesha Randolph  – Vocals (background), Duet vocal on "Smile"
Marcus Randolph  – Drums
Candice Anderson  – Vocals (background)

Production

Mike Buckman  – Art Direction, Design
Danny Clinch  – Photography
Gene Grimaldi  – Mastering
Ryan Hewitt  – Engineer
Chris Holmes  – Assistant Engineer
Robert Randolph and the Family Band  – Producer
Jim Scott  – Producer, Engineer, Mixing

References

2003 debut albums
Robert Randolph and the Family Band albums
Warner Music Group live albums